Garrett William Ford Sr. (born May 4, 1945) is a former American football player, coach, and college athletics administrator.  A native of Washington, D.C., and a graduate of DeMatha Catholic High School, he played college football at West Virginia University, and professionally in the American Football League (NFL) with the Denver Broncos.  Ford received a bachelor's degree in physical education from WVU in 1969 and earned a master's degree in guidance and counseling from WVU in 1973. Ford  later returned to his alma mater and served an assistant football coach and assistant athletics director. He was the first African American assistant coach in West Virginia University history and is a member of the West Virginia Sports Hall of Fame. Ford's son, Garrett Ford Jr., was also a starting tailback for West Virginia.

West Virginia University Football

At WVU Ford first Mountaineer to top both 2,000 career rushing yards and 1,000 yards in a single season, tallying 2,166 yards from 1965-67. In 1965, Ford led the team in rushing with 894 yards. His 1,068 yards as a junior in 1966 placed him first at that time and is still the fifth best on the WVU record books. Ford is one of only three running backs to lead WVU in season total offense over the course of the last 35 years. He accomplished that with 1,082 yards of total offense in 1966.

Denver Broncos

In 1968, Ford was drafted by the Denver Broncos in the 3rd round with the 58th pick. Ford played two years with the Broncos.

Return to West Virginia University

Ford joined the Mountaineer Football staff in 1970 as an assistant football coach for Bobby Bowden. At the time, he was the first black assistant coach hired by the school. He was named academic counselor in 1977, assistant athletic director in 1985 and associate athletic director in 2002.

Ford was inducted into the West Virginia University Hall of Fame in 1995 and into the School of Physical Education Hall of Fame in 2004.

In 2011, Ford announced his retirement from WVU after more than 44 years of service to the university.

Personal Life

Ford and his wife, Thelma, have two children – Tracie and Garrett Jr., also a past Mountaineer football player. Additionally, Ford and his wife have five grandchildren.

References

1945 births
Living people
American football running backs
Denver Broncos (AFL) players
West Virginia Mountaineers football coaches
West Virginia Mountaineers football players
Players of American football from Washington, D.C.
African-American coaches of American football
African-American players of American football
21st-century African-American people
20th-century African-American sportspeople